Gacka is a river located in the Lika region in central Croatia. Because for a large part of its course it is a subterranean river, estimates on its length vary. It has been regulated by man to flow into an aqueduct in Gusić polje (known as Tunel Gacka-Gusić Jezero) and then into the Adriatic Sea through a hydroelectric installation HE Senj near Sveti Juraj. HE Senj takes inflow from Gacka and Lika, since it was built in 1965. The river passes through karst fields and most notably the town Otočac, and its headwaters are known as a popular locale for trout fishing.

References

Rivers of Croatia